is a Japanese voice actress affiliated with Tokyo Actor's Consumer's Cooperative Society. Her major roles include Ichigo Momomiya, the main character of magical girl series Tokyo Mew Mew, Chizuru Honshou in Bleach and Mimi Tasogare in Duel Masters.

Personal life
Her voice type is mezzo-soprano. She has a First-class Kindergarten Teacher License and her special skill is playing the flute. On September 3, 2020, She announced on Twitter the birth of her second child with Hino.

Filmography

Television animation
 Bleach as Chizuru Honshou.
 Blue Dragon as Bouquet
 Circlet Princess as Miyuki Kasahara
 Daitoshokan no Hitsujikai as Maho Mochizuki
 Duel Masters as Mimi Tasogare
Princess Tsubame as Tsubame Akizuki; ED theme song performance
 Gravion Zwei as Dika
 Hayate the Combat Butler as Saki Kijima, Taiga Ookouchi
 Märchen Awakens Romance as Dorothy
 Muteki Kanban Musume as Wakana Endou
 Ragnarok The Animation as Alice
Shodan, Secret of Heaven Wars as Kana Murata
 Star Twinkle PreCure as Yumika Nasu
 Strawberry Panic! as Chikaru Minamoto
 To Heart 2 as Karin Sasamori
 Tokyo Mew Mew as Ichigo Momomiya; ED theme song performance
 Zettai Karen Children as Keiko Kojika

Video games
 Hayate the Combat Butler -  Saki Kijima
 Märchen Awakens Romance -  Dorothy
 Rockman Zero 4 - Sol Titanion
 Star Ocean: Second Evolution - Celine Jules
 Strawberry Panic -  Chikaru Minamoto
 To Heart 2 -  Karin Sasamori
 Tokyo Mew Mew  - Ichigo Momomiya
 Trapt - Allura
 Eiyuu Senki -  Alexander The Great, William Kidd

Japanese-Other
 Ganko the Sea Castle (Oto)
 Sora no Iro, Mizu no Iro (Asa Mizushima - OVA 2)

References

External links
  
 

Living people
1978 births
Japanese video game actresses
Japanese voice actresses
Tokyo Actor's Consumer's Cooperative Society voice actors
Voice actresses from Saitama Prefecture
20th-century Japanese actresses
21st-century Japanese actresses